András Balogi (4 August 1941 – 25 March 2001) was a Hungarian equestrian. He competed in the team jumping event at the 1980 Summer Olympics.

References

External links
 

1941 births
2001 deaths
Hungarian male equestrians
Olympic equestrians of Hungary
Equestrians at the 1980 Summer Olympics
Sportspeople from Borsod-Abaúj-Zemplén County